Emperor Kang of Jin (322 – 17 November 344), personal name Sima Yue, courtesy name Shitong, was an emperor of the Eastern Jin Dynasty (266–420). He was a son of Emperor Ming and younger brother (by the same mother) of Emperor Cheng.  His reign was brief—only two years.

Prior to reign
Sima Yue was born in 322 as the second son of Emperor Ming, by his wife Empress Yu Wenjun.  After his father died in 325 and was succeeded by his brother Emperor Cheng, Sima Yue was created the Prince of Wu in 326.  In 327, because his uncle Sima Yu the Prince of Langya wanted to yield that more honorific title, Sima Yu was created the Prince of Kuaiji and Sima Yue was created the Prince of Langya.  It is not known where Sima Yue was during the Su Jun Disturbance of 326–328—whether he was captured and held hostage like his emperor brother, at his principality of Wu (which Su Jun did not occupy), or elsewhere.  During his brother's reign, he received a progression of offices, but did not appear to actually participate in major decision-making.

In summer 342, Emperor Cheng grew gravely ill.  He had two young sons -- Sima Pi and Sima Yi, then still in cradles, by his concubine Consort Zhou.  Yu Bing, one of the top two officials and Emperor Cheng's (and Sima Yue's) uncle, fearful that the Yu clan would lose power if a young emperor were named, persuaded Emperor Cheng that in the face of the powerful enemy Later Zhao, an older emperor should be named. Emperor Cheng agreed and designated Sima Yue the Prince of Langya, despite the other top official He Chong's opposition.  He died soon after, and Sima Yue took the throne as Emperor Kang.  (He Chong did not make secret his opposition; after Emperor Kang took the throne, when he thanked Yu and He for making him emperor, He stated, "The reason why Your Imperial Majesty can fly like a dragon is Yu Bing.  If I were listened to, we would not have this current prosperous reign."  Emperor Kang appeared humiliated, but did not retaliate against He (although He himself would request to become a local governor to avoid working with Yu Bing, and his request was granted) and continued to respect him.)

Reign
In early 343, Emperor Kang created his wife Chu Suanzi empress.

Later in 343, Emperor Kang's other uncle, Yu Yi, proposed a major military campaign against Later Zhao, in coordination with Former Yan's ruler Murong Huang and Former Liang's ruler Zhang Jun, both nominal Jin vassals.  Most officials feared this large undertaking, but with support from Yu Bing, Huan Wen (Emperor Kang's brother-in-law, having married his sister Sima Xingnan the Princess Nankang), and Sima Wuji the Prince of Qiao, Emperor Kang approved the plan and mobilized troops.  Yu Bing was made a governor to coordinate with Yu Yi, and He Chong was recalled to replace him, and served in conjunction with Emperor Kang's father-in-law Chu Pou (who, however, soon yielded his post).  However, Yu Yi eventually, for reasons unknown, largely did not carry out his campaign, although he made some border attacks.

In fall 344, Emperor Kang grew ill.  Yu Bing and Yu Yi wanted to support his uncle Sima Yu the Prince of Kuaiji as emperor, but He Chong, consistent with his prior advice to Emperor Cheng, suggested that Emperor Kang should pass the throne to his son Sima Dan.  Emperor Kang agreed and created Sima Dan crown prince.  He died two days later, and was succeeded by the one-year-old Crown Prince Dan (as Emperor Mu).

Era name
 Jianyuan (建元, jiàn yuán): 11 February 343 – 21 February 345

Family
Consorts and Issue:
 Empress Kangxian, of the Chu clan of Henan (324–384), personal name Suanzi
 Sima Dan, Emperor Mu (343–361), first son

Ancestry

References

322 births
344 deaths
Jin dynasty (266–420) emperors
4th-century Chinese monarchs